Arv (Heritage) is the second full-length album by the Norwegian Viking / folk metal band Ásmegin. It was released on November 28, 2008 through Napalm Records.

Track listing
All tracks by Ásmegin

 "Fandens Mælkebøtte" (The Devil's Milk Pail) – 4:10	
 "Hiertebrand" (Heartburning) – 4:08
 "Generalen Og Troldharen" (The General and the Trollhare) – 5:27	
 "Arv" (Heritage) – 5:40	
 "Yndifall" (Bereavement) – 6:38
 "Gengangeren" (The Apparition) – 4:32	
 "Prunkende, Stolt I Jokumsol" (Pompously, Proudly in the Sun of Jokum) – 2:41	
 "En Myrmylne" (A Boggy Waltz) – 9:00

Personnel 
Erik Fossan Rasmussen – vocals, drums
Raymond Håkenrud – guitars, bass, vocals, piano
Marius Olaussen – guitars, bass, mandolin, accordion, piano, mellotron
Lars Fredrik Frøislie – hammond organ

References

2008 albums
Ásmegin albums